Park Sang-hoon (Korean: 박상훈; born on May 2, 2005) is a South Korean child actor. He made his acting debut in 2014, since then, he  appeared in number of historical television series as child and young actor. He is known for his roles  in Warriors of the Dawn (2017), River Where the Moon Rises (2021), Lovers of the Red Sky (2021) and Show Window: The Queen's House (2021-22).

Career
Park Sang-hoon made his debut in the film Cat in 2014 and later appeared as child actor in various historical dramas. In 2021 he played childhood counterparts of Grand Prince Juhyang in SBS historical-fantasy drama Lovers of the Red Sky, Prince Go-won in KBS historical TV series River Where the Moon Rises, Jeong Jin-soo in Netflix dark fantasy Hellbound and Baek Soo-hyeon intvN mystery thriller drama The Road: The Tragedy of One. He also played a supporting role in  Channel A's mystery drama Show Window: The Queen's House.

Park was nominated for Best Young Actor award at 2021 KBS Drama Awards for his portrayal of young prince Go-won in River Where the Moon Rises.

Filmography

Films

Television series

Web series

Ambassadorship 
 Ambassador for Water Team & Team (2022)

Awards and nominations

References

External links
 Park Sang-hoon, official website
 
 Park Sang-hoon on Daum 

Living people
2005 births
South Korean male child actors
21st-century South Korean male actors
South Korean male television actors
South Korean male film actors